Chris Gould (born December 10, 1985) is a former American football placekicker. He currently serves as the assistant special teams coach for the Los Angeles Chargers, and is the brother of San Francisco 49ers placekicker Robbie Gould. Gould has six years of experience coaching special teams, including three seasons at the collegiate level with Syracuse University from 2012–14.

College career
Gould went to the University of Virginia and played for the Virginia Cavaliers football team. During his freshman year, after an injury, Gould took over punting duties, kicking 18 punts for an average of 38.6 yards. As a sophomore, he started all year at punter. In 2005, he averaged 40.0 yard per punt, the highest in Virginia history since 2001. As a junior, he moved to kicker. He went 11 for 19 on field goals, and didn't miss a single extra point. In his senior year, he went 16 for 20 on field goals, but missed 2 extra points.

Professional career
After going undrafted in the 2008 NFL Draft, Gould spent two years out of football. He then signed with Chicago Rush of the Arena Football League in 2010. Gould spent two seasons with the Rush before signing with the Arizona Rattlers in 2012, where he was a member of the ArenaBowl XXV champions.

Coaching career
In 2012, Gould joined the Syracuse Orange football team's staff as special teams quality control coach. Two years later, he joined the Denver Broncos to serve the same position. On February 7, 2016, Gould was part of the Broncos coaching staff that won Super Bowl 50. In the game, the Broncos defeated the Carolina Panthers by a score of 24–10. In January 2017, he was promoted to assistant special teams coach for the Broncos. On February 7, 2022, the Broncos announced that Gould would not be retained for the 2022 season.

On February 19, 2022, Gould was hired by the Los Angeles Chargers to serve as the team's assistant special teams coach for the 2022 season.

References

External links
Virginia bio
CBS Sports bio

Living people
1985 births
American football placekickers
Virginia Cavaliers football players
Chicago Rush players
Arizona Rattlers players
Iowa Barnstormers players
Syracuse Orange football coaches
Denver Broncos coaches
Players of American football from Pennsylvania
People from Lock Haven, Pennsylvania
Los Angeles Kiss players
Elmhurst Bluejays football coaches